Hathorn Hall is a historic academic building on the campus of Bates College in Lewiston, Maine.  Built in 1857 to a design by Gridley J.F. Bryant, it was the college's first academic building following the move of the Maine State Seminary (as it was then known) from Parsonsfield to Lewiston.  The building was listed on the National Register of Historic Places in 1970.

Description
Hathorn Hall is centrally located on the Bates College Campus, which is located northeast of Lewiston's commercial downtown area.  The hall is a rectangular brick building, three stories in height, with a hip roof capped by a cupola housing an open belfry.  Low pedimented gables rise from the short ends of the roof.  The gables and the roof's cornice are studded with modillions. Its main entrance, set on one of the short ends, is sheltered by a rectangular flat-roof portico, which has fluted Corinthian columns supporting a full entablature with cornice.

History
Hathorn Hall and Parker Halls were completed in 1857 by Gridley J.F. Bryant as the first buildings on the Bates campus, then called the Maine State Seminary. Bryant also completed the main building on the Tufts University campus in 1852.  The building was named after Seth Hathorn and Mary Hathorn of Woolwich, Maine who donated funds for the construction of the building. Jonathan Davis donated the bell in Hathorn's bell tower. Nineteenth century "ivy stones" from early classes at the college are embedded in the brick along the exterior of the building.

Hathorn Hall's interior has changed several times since its original construction. A fire started in the bell tower of Hathorn Hall in 1881 which severely damaged much of the interior of the building, and the interior was again renovated in 1898, 1960–62, and 1984 (with $180,000 from the Pew Foundation). The building was added to the National Register of Historic Places in 1970.  As of 2010 Hathorn Hall is home to Bates' mathematics and foreign language departments and two computer labs.

Images

See also

National Register of Historic Places listings in Androscoggin County, Maine

References

University and college buildings completed in 1857
School buildings on the National Register of Historic Places in Maine
Bates College
University and college academic buildings in the United States
Buildings and structures in Lewiston, Maine
National Register of Historic Places in Lewiston, Maine
1857 establishments in Maine